Rafael Alcântara do Nascimento (born 12 February 1993), commonly known as Rafinha, is a Brazilian professional footballer who plays as a attacking midfielder for Qatar Stars League club Al-Arabi.

He started his career with Barcelona, making his debut with the first team in 2011. After a loan at Celta, he played his first La Liga match for the former club in 2014. In October 2020, he signed with Paris Saint-Germain. 

Rafinha represented both Spain and Brazil at youth level, before debuting with the latter as a senior in 2015.

Club career

Barcelona
Born in São Paulo, Brazil, Rafinha joined Barcelona's youth ranks at the age of 13. On 8 January 2011 he made his professional debut with the B team, coming on as a substitute for Jonathan dos Santos in the 55th minute of a 2–1 home loss against Girona in the Segunda División. A week later, again off the bench and in the same competition, he scored his first goal in a 3–2 win at Salamanca, also adding an assist.

Rafinha made his debut with the senior Barcelona squad on 9 November 2011, taking the place of Cesc Fàbregas for the last 15 minutes of a 1–0 away victory over Hospitalet in the Copa del Rey. He finished the league season with 39 games – 35 starts – and eight goals for the reserves, including two in a 4–0 defeat of Cartagena on 4 September of the same year.

On 27 June 2013, Rafinha extended his contract with Barça, keeping him at the club until 2016. A few weeks later, he was loaned to fellow La Liga team Celta, and made his debut in the Spanish top flight on 19 August, helping the Galicians to a 2–2 home draw against Espanyol. He scored his first league goal 12 days later in another draw at the Balaídos (1–1, with Granada).

Rafinha netted a brace at Real Sociedad on 23 November 2013, but it amounted to nothing as the hosts won 4–3 with four goals from Carlos Vela. He was voted the league's Breakthrough Player of the Season, ahead of Real Madrid's Jesé and Rayo Vallecano's Saúl Ñíguez.

Rafinha made his league debut for Barcelona on 24 August 2014 in Luis Enrique's first match in charge, playing the first half of an eventual 3–0 win against Elche at the Camp Nou before being replaced by Marc Bartra. On 25 November, he assisted Lionel Messi's goal in a 4–0 group stage victory at APOEL, which made him the outright top scorer in the history of the UEFA Champions League; however, he was also sent off for two bookings later on in the match.

Rafinha scored his first goal for the Blaugrana on 3 December 2014, concluding a 4–0 away win against Huesca in the first leg of the Spanish Cup's last 32 (12–1 aggregate). The following 1 February, he recorded his first goal for the team in the domestic league, part of a 3–2 home defeat of Villarreal. They went on to win the treble, with the player being an unused substitute in the domestic and European finals.

With compatriot Neymar out through illness, Rafinha started on the left of Barcelona's attack in the 2015 UEFA Super Cup against Sevilla in Tbilisi, scoring the third goal in a 5–4 win. On 16 September he suffered a torn right anterior cruciate ligament during the 1–1 away draw to Roma in the Champions League group phase, leaving the game on a stretcher after being on the receiving end of a heavy challenge from Radja Nainggolan; after surgery, he was expected to be out for about six months.

Rafinha scored six times in only 18 appearances in the 2016–17 campaign, but also had to undergo surgery to an internal meniscus ailment following a match against Granada in April 2017, going on to be sidelined until the end of the year.

On 22 January 2018, Inter Milan announced the acquisition of Rafinha on a loan with an option to buy for €35 million. He made his debut for the club six days later by entering in the last moments of the 1–1 draw against S.P.A.L. He scored his first goal on 6 May, in the 4–0 away victory over Udinese.

On 24 November 2018, Rafinha ruptured the anterior cruciate ligament of his left knee during a 1–1 draw at Atlético Madrid, being again sidelined for several months. On 2 September 2019, immediately after extending his contract until 2021, he rejoined Celta on a season-long loan.

Paris Saint-Germain
Rafinha signed a three-year deal with Paris Saint-Germain on 5 October 2020. He made his Ligue 1 debut 11 days later in a 4–0 win at Nîmes, and assisted the opening goal scored by Kylian Mbappé.

On 27 December 2021, Rafinha joined Real Sociedad on loan for the remainder of the season. He scored his only goal the following 13 February, closing the 2–0 home defeat of Granada.

Al-Arabi
On 3 September 2022, Rafinha moved to Al-Arabi of the Qatar Stars League on a two-year contract.

International career
Rafinha played for Spain at youth level, earning 14 caps for three different teams. On 29 February 2012, he scored for the under-19s in the first minute of their 2–1 friendly win over France in Meaux.

Later that year, however, Rafinha switched allegiance to Brazil, going on to represent the under-20 side at the 2013 South American Youth Championship in Argentina. He was one of seven stand-by players named by Dunga for the senior team at the 2015 Copa América.

In September 2015, Rafinha was called up by Dunga for friendlies against Costa Rica and the United States. On 5 September, he entered the former game at New Jersey's Red Bull Arena in the 81st minute in place of Luiz Gustavo. Four days later, a minute after taking the field against the latter, he scored his first goal, then assisted clubmate Neymar in a 4–1 win.

Personal life
Rafinha's father, Mazinho, was also a footballer and a midfielder, notably winning the 1994 FIFA World Cup with Brazil. His mother Valéria played volleyball, while his older brother, Thiago – another midfielder – also emerged through Barcelona's youth ranks, going on to represent its first team and the Spain national side.

Rodrigo, who played youth football with Real Madrid and went on to spend several seasons with Benfica and Valencia, is a lifelong friend who has erroneously been referred to as Rafinha's cousin.

Career statistics

Club

Notes

International

Scores and results list Brazil's goal tally first, score column indicates score after each Rafinha goal.

Honours

Barcelona
La Liga: 2014–15, 2015–16, 2018–19
Copa del Rey: 2011–12, 2014–15, 2015–16, 2016–17, 2017–18
Supercopa de España: 2016, 2019
UEFA Champions League: 2014–15
UEFA Super Cup: 2015
FIFA Club World Cup: 2015

Paris Saint-Germain
Ligue 1: 2021–22
Coupe de France: 2020–21
Brazil U20
Toulon Tournament: 2013

Brazil U23
Summer Olympic Games: 2016

Individual
La Liga Breakthrough Player: 2013–14
La Liga Player of the Month: February 2014

References

External links

1993 births
Living people
Brazilian emigrants to Spain
Naturalised citizens of Spain
Brazilian footballers
Spanish footballers
Footballers from São Paulo
Association football midfielders
La Liga players
Segunda División players
FC Barcelona Atlètic players
FC Barcelona players
RC Celta de Vigo players
Real Sociedad footballers
Serie A players
Inter Milan players
Ligue 1 players
Paris Saint-Germain F.C. players
Qatar Stars League players
Al-Arabi SC (Qatar) players
UEFA Champions League winning players
Spain youth international footballers
Brazil youth international footballers
Brazil under-20 international footballers
Brazil international footballers
Olympic footballers of Brazil
Footballers at the 2016 Summer Olympics
Olympic medalists in football
Medalists at the 2016 Summer Olympics
Olympic gold medalists for Brazil
Brazilian expatriate footballers
Expatriate footballers in Spain
Expatriate footballers in Italy
Expatriate footballers in France
Expatriate footballers in Qatar
Brazilian expatriate sportspeople in Spain
Brazilian expatriate sportspeople in Italy
Brazilian expatriate sportspeople in France
Brazilian expatriate sportspeople in Qatar